The Officers' Mess is a 1931 British comedy film directed by Manning Haynes and starring Richard Cooper, Harold French and Elsa Lanchester. It was made at Walton Studios. It was released as a quota quickie by Paramount Pictures.

A Lieutenant becomes mixed-up with some stolen jewels.

Cast
 Richard Cooper as Tony Turnbull  
 Harold French as Budge Harbottle  
 Elsa Lanchester as Cora Melville  
 Lilian Oldland as Kitty  
 Max Avieson as Bolton  
 Margery Binner as Phoebe  
 George Bellamy as Insp. Bedouin  
 Annie Esmond as Mrs. Makepiece  
 Fewlass Llewellyn as Adm. Harbottle  
 Helen Haye as Mrs. Harbottle  
 Faith Bennett as Ann Telford 
 Gordon Begg

References

Bibliography
 Low, Rachael. Filmmaking in 1930s Britain. George Allen & Unwin, 1985.
 Wood, Linda. British Films, 1927-1939. British Film Institute, 1986.

External links

1931 films
British comedy films
1931 comedy films
1930s English-language films
Films shot at Nettlefold Studios
Films directed by H. Manning Haynes
Quota quickies
British black-and-white films
1930s British films